The North Arm Bridge is an extradosed bridge in Metro Vancouver, British Columbia, Canada. It spans the north arm of the Fraser River, linking Vancouver to Richmond. It is used by trains on the Canada Line, which opened in August 2009.

The bridge also has a dedicated pedestrian and bicycle pathway underneath its wing on the west side, which was added by Translink at a cost of $10 million.

Bridge Details

The North Arm Bridge does not carry automotive vehicles, as the neighbouring Oak Street Bridge does. The bridge has two tracks enabling SkyTrain to pass each other either way traversing the bridge between Bridgeport Station in Richmond and Marine Drive Station in south Vancouver.

History
The bridge incurred one fatality during its construction. Andrew Slobodian died on January 21, 2008, when the crane he was operating tipped over, crushing him. A small plaque was installed in the middle of the bridge in his memory.

See also
 List of crossings of the Fraser River
 List of bridges in Canada

References

External links

Extradosed bridges
Extradosed bridges in Canada
Bridges in Greater Vancouver
Bridges over the Fraser River
Canada Line
Railway bridges in British Columbia
Pedestrian bridges in Canada
Buildings and structures in Vancouver
Buildings and structures in Richmond, British Columbia
Transport in Richmond, British Columbia
Rapid transit bridges